State Road 255 (NM 255) is a  state highway in the US state of New Mexico. NM 255's western terminus is at NM 256 southeast of Roswell, and the eastern terminus is at NM 253 southeast of Roswell.

Major intersections

See also

References

255
Transportation in Chaves County, New Mexico